Wildwood Park (also spelled Wildewood) is a suburban, planned community in Winnipeg that has a central green space and no front roads (only back alleys), with communal walkways, playgrounds, and parks.

Nearly all of the original houses are based on five variations of three basic designs, pre-fabricated in one section of the site. The site plan concept is based on the Radburn community design of architects Henry Wright and Clarence Stein who advocated the idea of designing  neighbourhoods for the "motor age". It varies from the original in the introduction of crescents (or loops) as the local access roads. It was developed in 1946–47 by Hubert Bird and designed by Green, Blankstein, Russell (GBR). It is well known as an early example of the Radburn pattern, which has found extensive application in the second half of the 20th century. It presages the emergence of the fused grid that uses the same principle of filtered permeability.

Governance
Wildwood Park is in the Fort Rouge–East Fort Garry city ward and the Pembina Trails School Division of Winnipeg. It corresponds to Statistics Canada's census dissemination area 110466, in census tract 0503.00, within the Winnipeg census division, part of the Winnipeg census metropolitan area. It comprises much of the Wildwood neighbourhood of Winnipeg, within the Fort Garry North neighbourhood cluster (according to how census data is reported for the city of Winnipeg). It is in the Fort Garry provincial electoral division (Fort Garry-Riverview from 2008 to 2018) and the Winnipeg South Centre federal electoral division. Before the unicity amalgamation in 1972, this was part of the Rural Municipality of Fort Garry.

References

Further reading 
 Gillmor, Don. 2005. "Urban Planning: Wildwood Childhood," Canadian Geographic 125(4). p 54.
 Martin, Michael David. 2001. "Returning to Radburn," Landscape Journal 20(2):156–75.
 —— 2001. "The Landscapes of Winnipeg's Wildwood Park," Urban History Review 30(1):22–39.
 —— 2002. "The Case for Residential Back-Alleys: A North American Perspective," in Journal of Housing and the Built Environment 17(2):145–71.
 —— 2004. "Designing the Next Radburn: A Green-hearted American Neighbourhood for the 21st Century", proceedings of Open Space/People Space: An International Conference on Inclusive Environments, Edinburgh: Research Centre for Inclusive Access to Outdoor Environments. .
 Nelson, Carl. 1985. Wildwood Park Study, Ottawa: Canada Mortgage and Housing Corporation.
 Reimer, Mavis. 1989. Wildwood Park Through the Years, Winnipeg: Wildwood History Book Committee. .
 Toews, Sigfried. 1973. A Tribute to Wildwood Park: a housing report for J. Lehrman, Winnipeg: University of Manitoba.
 "Operation Integrated: Two New House Designs, Site Selection, Wildwood Park, Fort Garry" in Builders' Bulletin 10. Ottawa: Central Mortgage and Housing Corporation (1948 March 6).

External links
  The Landscapes of Winnipeg's Wildwood Park

Neighbourhoods in Winnipeg
Planned communities in Canada
Fort Garry, Winnipeg
Fort Rouge, Winnipeg